Arthur Pickering (1878 – 15 December 1939) was an English cricketer. He played for Gloucestershire between 1901 and 1908.

References

1878 births
1939 deaths
English cricketers
Gloucestershire cricketers
Place of birth missing
London County cricketers